Sharolyn Scott Norman (born 27 October 1983 in Limón) is a Costa Rican hurdler. At the 2012 Summer Olympics, she competed in the Women's 400 metres hurdles.

Personal bests
100 m: 12.50 s (wind: +0.0 m/s) –  San Pedro Sula, 28 June 2008
200 m: 24.45 s (wind: +1.3 m/s) –  Medellín, 6 October 2013
400 m: 54.24 s  –  Bogotá, 20 July 2013
110 m hurdles: 14.57 s (wind: +1.8 m/s) –  San Salvador, 13 July 2007
400 m hurdles: 56.19 s –  Rehlingen-Siersburg, 28 May 2012

International competitions

References

External links

Sports reference biography

1983 births
Living people
People from Limón Province
Costa Rican female hurdlers
Costa Rican female sprinters
Olympic athletes of Costa Rica
Athletes (track and field) at the 2012 Summer Olympics
Athletes (track and field) at the 2016 Summer Olympics
Pan American Games competitors for Costa Rica
Athletes (track and field) at the 2011 Pan American Games
Athletes (track and field) at the 2015 Pan American Games
World Athletics Championships athletes for Costa Rica
Competitors at the 2010 Central American and Caribbean Games
Competitors at the 2014 Central American and Caribbean Games
Competitors at the 2018 Central American and Caribbean Games
Central American Games gold medalists for Costa Rica
Central American Games medalists in athletics
Central American Games silver medalists for Costa Rica
Central American Games bronze medalists for Costa Rica